The 2006–07 season was Olympiacos's 48th consecutive season in the Super League Greece and their 81st year in existence. The club were played their 10th consecutive season in the UEFA Champions League. Manager Trond Sollied left the club by mutual consent on December 29, 2006 due to the club's lower-than-expected performance of the team in the UEFA Champions League, and was replaced by Greek Takis Lemonis.

Squad

Squad changes during 2006/2007 season

In: 
 Tomislav Butina
 Abdeslam Ouaddou
 Felix Borja
 Marco Ne
 Michał Żewłakow
 Didier Domi
 Júlio César Santos Correa
 Charilaos Pappas return from Apollon Kalamarias
 Vasilis Torosidis from Skoda Xanthi (Dec. 2006)

Out:
 Gabriel Schurrer free transfer to Málaga CF
 Tasos Kyriakos free transfer to Aris Thessaloniki
 Spyros Vallas on loan to AE Larisa
 Dimitris Mavrogennidis free transfer to Iraklis Thessaloniki
 Stelios Venetidis free transfer to AEL 1964
 Alexandre Joaquim D'Akol on loan to Kerkyra FC
 Yaya Touré transferred to AS Monaco
 Daniel García Lara free transfer
 Abdeslam Ouaddou free transfer (Dec. 2006)
 Athanasios Kostoulas free transfer to Skoda Xanthi

Club

The Management

Other information

Competitions

Overall

Super League Greece

Classification

Results summary

Results by round

Matches
All times at EET

Greek Cup

Fourth round

Fifth round

Quarter-finals

UEFA Champions League

Group stage

All times at CET

Team kit

|

|

|

|

References

External links 
 Official Website of Olympiacos Piraeus 

Olympiacos F.C. seasons
Olympiacos F.C.
Greek football championship-winning seasons